Tryptophan hydroxylase 1 (TPH1) is an isoenzyme of tryptophan hydroxylase which in humans is encoded by the TPH1 gene.

TPH1 was first discovered to synthesize serotonin in 1988 and was thought that there only was a single TPH gene until 2003, while a second form was found in the mouse (Tph2), rat and human brain (TPH2) and the original TPH was then renamed to TPH1.

Function 

Tryptophan hydroxylases catalyze the biopterin-dependent monooxygenation of tryptophan to 5-hydroxytryptophan (5-HTP), which is subsequently decarboxylated to form the neurotransmitter serotonin (5-hydroxytryptamine or 5-HT). It is the rate-limiting enzyme in the biosynthesis of serotonin.

TPH expression is limited to a few specialized tissues: raphe neurons, pinealocytes, mast cells, mononuclear leukocytes, beta-cells of the islets of Langerhans, and intestinal and pancreatic enterochromaffin cells.

Clinical significance 

Tryptophan hydroxylase is important for synthesizing indoleamine neurotransmitters and related compounds in the body and brain, including serotonin, melatonin, tryptamine, N-methyltryptamine, and N,N-dimethyltryptamine. TPH1 is expressed in the body, but not the brain.
Nevertheless, the effect of variations in the TPH1 gene on brain-related variables, such as personality traits and neuropsychiatric disorders, has been studied. 
For example, one study (1998) found an association between a polymorphism in the gene with impulsive-aggression measures, while a case-control study (2001) could find no association between polymorphisms and Alzheimer's disease.

One human mutant of TPH1, A218C found in intron 7,  is highly associated with schizophrenia. Introns are regions of DNA that do not code for the amino acid sequence of a protein and were long considered to be 'junk DNA' lacking purpose. The correlation of an intron mutation with schizophrenia is significant because it suggests that introns have an important role in translation, transcription, or another, possibly unknown, aspect of the production of proteins from DNA.

See also
 Tryptophan hydroxylase
 TPH2
 Rs1799913 (A779C): intron related to figural and numeric creativity
 rs1800532 (A218C)

References

Further reading

External links 
 

EC 1.14.16